Nandigama revenue division is an administrative division in the NTR district of the Indian state of Andhra Pradesh. It is one of the 3 revenue divisions in the district with 7 mandals under its administration and is formed on 4 April 2022 as part of a reorganisation of districts in the state. Nandigama serves as the headquarters of the division.

Administration 
The mandals in the division are Nandigama, Kanchikacherla, Chandarlapadu, Veerullapadu, Jaggaiahpeta, Vatsavai and Penuganchiprolu.

References 

Revenue divisions in NTR district